Lynn Murray is a Scottish actress.

In 2011, Murray played the role of the nurse in the Scottish film In Search of La Che before going on to play the role of Melanie in the short film Falling for Fitzgerald which earned her the Best Acting accolade at the 2012 British Academy Scotland New Talent Awards.

She recently played the role of Gemma in the short film Notes directed by John McPhail.

Filmography

Awards and nominations

References

External links

Living people
Scottish film actresses
Scottish stage actresses
Scottish television actresses
Year of birth missing (living people)
British Academy Scotland New Talent Award Winners